Predrag Jovanović (Serbian Cyrillic: Предраг Јовановић) (born 14 April 1950, Kruševac, SR Serbia, SFR Yugoslavia) is a Serbian musician and entertainer. He is known as a former frontman of the Yugoslav group D' Boys by his stage alias Peđa D' Boy, and previously as a vocalist for the German rock band Jane.

Biography

Son of a mother, Mila Matić, who was a singer, Jovanović was a vocalist of the group Lutalice during the 1960s. In 1967 he had a cameo appearance in the famous Yugoslav Black Wave film Kad budem mrtav i beo by the acclaimed director Živojin Pavlović. In the famous singing contest scene he is introduced as "Predrag Jovanović, young hippie from Kruševac" before proceeding to sing "I'm a Believer" by The Monkees.

Jovanović moved to France where he played various clubs as well as in metro stations. Much like other hippies of the period, he also visited Goa in India where he performed with rock and jazz musicians from all around the world.

Being good at fashion design and tailoring, in the mid-1970s he opened a clothing store on Ibiza, where in 1980 he met the members of the West German rock group Jane. He became their rhythm guitarist and vocalist, participating in the recording of their 10th album. In the early 1980s, he returned to SFR Yugoslavia, trying to establish himself on the then vibrant Yugoslav pop and rock scene. He played a session gig at the exhibition of the prominent Yugoslav comic book artist Igor Kordej, together with another musician, Miško Mihajlovski, with whom he formed the group D' Boys in 1982, nicknaming himself Peđa D'Boy.

D' Boys became popular all around former Yugoslavia for their humorous style and partying image, and especially for its synthpop hit "Jugoslovenka" (Yugoslav girl), although they were often mocked by the media for their trivial lyrics. The group released two albums,  Ajd' se zezamo and Muvanje.

After few years, Miško Mihajlovski left the band and started performing as Miško D' Boys, while the rest of the group led by Peđa D' Boy changed its name to Peđa D' Boy Band and released their album Avantura in 1985. Later, Peđa started a solo career and represented SFR Yugoslavia at the Song of the Mediterranean festival in Palermo, where he got the second prize. He also took part in YU Rock Misija, the Yugoslav contribution to Band Aid.

After releasing his album Laku ti noć mala produced by Kornelije Kovač, Peđa left the country in 1987. He appeared once more in 1992 on a retro-concert of ex-Yugoslav pop and rock music in Belgrade. In 1997, in London, he recorded a new material, produced by Mark Evans, including a remix of the D'Boys best known hit "Jugoslovenka".

He resides in Belgrade where he still performs. In May 2007, he took part in Veliki Brat VIP, local version of the celebrity Big Brother reality show, featuring popular personalities from Serbia, Bosnia, and Montenegro.

Discography

With D'Boys

Singles
 "Mi smo D'Boys" / "Crne oči, plava ljubav" (Jugoton, 1983)

Studio albums
 Ajd' se zezamo (Jugoton, 1983)
 Muvanje (Jugoton, 1984)

With Peđa D' Boy Band 
 Avantura (Jugoton, 1985)

With Bilja Krstić

Singles
 Bubi (PGP RTB, 1985)

With Jane 
 Jane (Brain, 1980)

Solo works 
 General (City Records, 2008)

See also
 D' Boys
 SFR Yugoslav pop and rock scene
 Serbian rock

References
Janjatović, Petar. Ilustrovana Enciklopedija YU Rocka 1960-1997, page: 50, publisher: Geopoetika, 1997 
Official profile.myspace.com profile archive

1950 births
Living people
Musicians from Kruševac
Yugoslav rock singers
Serbian rock singers
Serbian pop singers
Yugoslav male singers
20th-century Serbian male singers
Big Brother (franchise) contestants
Big Brother (Serbian TV series)